Carlos Eduardo Salazar Paz (born 1 July 1981) is a Colombian retired football player who played as a midfielder. He has played for teams in Colombia, Costa Rica, Venezuela, Chile, Iran and the United States.

Club career

Colo-Colo 
On 1 February 2008, Salazar was signed by Colo-Colo. Salazar made his debut against Universidad de Concepción as a starter, scoring the only goal of the match at the 42 minute mark. He made his debut appearance in the Copa Libertadores by playing a match against Atlas, in which Colo-Colo lost 0-3. With the arrival of Fernando Astengo, Salazar was dropped from the team.

Mes Rafsanjan 
He returned to Venezuela to play in Aragua and Atlético Huila. During 2009, he was on trial in Real Salt Lake of Major League Soccer, but was unable to pass the test. In June, Salazar completed his move to the Iranian Second Division side Mes Rafsanjan. He played 15 matches (League and Hafzi Cup) and scored 13 goals.

Mes Kerman
After his regular pass in Rafsanjan, he signed a 2-year contract with Sanat Mes Kerman FC in the Premier league of Iran, but was fired on 22 December 2011.

Fort Lauderdale Strikers
On 25 March 2013 the Fort Lauderdale Strikers announced that Salazar had signed  with the club following a successful preseason with the Strikers.

Unión Magdalena
Salazar signed with Unión Magdalena after mutually terminating his contract with Fort Lauderdale.

References

External links
 BDFA profile

1981 births
Living people
Colombian footballers
Colombian expatriate footballers
Deportivo Cali footballers
Deportivo Pasto footballers
Cortuluá footballers
Atlético Bucaramanga footballers
Deportivo Pereira footballers
L.D. Alajuelense footballers
Zamora FC players
Colo-Colo footballers
Mes Rafsanjan players
Sanat Mes Kerman F.C. players
Atlético Huila footballers
Tauro F.C. players
Fort Lauderdale Strikers players
Unión Magdalena footballers
Miami Fusion players
Juticalpa F.C. players
Universitario Popayán footballers
Liga FPD players
Chilean Primera División players
North American Soccer League players
Categoría Primera A players
Categoría Primera B players
Persian Gulf Pro League players
Association football midfielders
Footballers from Cali
Colombian expatriate sportspeople in Iran
Colombian expatriate sportspeople in Costa Rica
Colombian expatriate sportspeople in Chile
Colombian expatriate sportspeople in Venezuela
Colombian expatriate sportspeople in Panama
Colombian expatriate sportspeople in the United States
Colombian expatriate sportspeople in Honduras
Expatriate footballers in Iran
Expatriate footballers in Costa Rica
Expatriate footballers in Chile
Expatriate footballers in Venezuela
Expatriate footballers in Panama
Expatriate soccer players in the United States
Expatriate footballers in Honduras